House at 15 East Cayuga Street in the village of Moravia, Cayuga County, New York, is a historic house that is listed on the National Register of Historic Places.

Description and history 
It is a two-story, frame Italianate style double residence. It was definitely built before 1887, and perhaps even before 1859. It was modified to its present appearance sometime between 1898 and 1908. The front features two 2-story, semi-octagonal bay windows.

Deemed significant architecturally "as the most intact historic duplex in Moravia" and as "an intact and representative example of Italianate style residential architecture in Moravia associated with the village's post-Civil War prosperity."

It was listed on the National Register on April 20, 1995.

References

External links

Duplex buildings
Houses on the National Register of Historic Places in New York (state)
Houses completed in 1900
Italianate architecture in New York (state)
Houses in Cayuga County, New York
National Register of Historic Places in Cayuga County, New York
Moravia (village), New York